Cigar Store Indians are an American rockabilly band from Crabapple, Georgia, United States.

The band formed in the summer of 1991 when singer/songwriter Ben Friedman moved back home from a year and a half stint playing in NYC. He met through a creative loafing ad lead guitar player Jimmy "Lownote" Lavender and they began working together on a vintage sound.  Both musicians shared a love for the 1950s blues/country sound  (called rockabilly music).  Ben's childhood friend, drummer Frances "Fast Pedal" Farran was enlisted to play the drums.  Many nights were spent practicing in "Fast Pedal" Farran's shed.  Friend and guitarist Rob Fickling was asked to switch to bass guitar and the first incarnation of CSI was born.
  
In 1995, after developing a large fan base in and around Atlanta, Georgia, the band was offered their first recording contract on Landslide Records.  It featured Lavender on lead guitar, new member Keith Perissi on Bass, Farran on drums, and Friedman on guitar and vocals. The record was produced and engineered by Rodney Mills and recorded in Atlanta at Triclops studio.  Constant touring and memorable songs landed the self-titled first release to #3 on the Gavin Americana Charts.  Highlights included an extended tour with the Squirrel Nut Zippers.
 
The band made a switch to drummer David "Pup" Roberts for their second release, El Baile de la Cobra, which was recorded for the North Carolina label, Deep South Records. Tom Maxwell and Kenny Mosher who are members of the band Squirrel Nut Zippers added horns on a few of the tracks and Rodney Mills again was produced and engineer the record.  The album quickly rose to #10 on the Gavin Americana Charts.

The third recording, Guestlist, was a live recording for the Atlanta-based, Overall Records and gave listeners a chance to sit in on a CSI live set from Smith's Olde Bar and Eddies Attic, both local Atlanta music mainstay clubs.  It featured a new drummer, Paul Barrie, who had previously been with Atlanta band, Donkey, Jim "Lownote" Lavender on lead guitar and vocals, Keith Perissi on bass guitar and vocals, and Ben Friedman on lead vocals and guitar.  This lineup toured extensively in the  United States and Europe.
 
Their last album, Built of Stone, was recorded by Jeff Bakos at his Amp Works Studio and was mastered by Rodney Mills; it was released on Overall Records.  It featured Paul Barrie on drums, Keith Perissi on bass guitar, Friedman on guitar and vocals, and Jeff Sprayberry on lead guitar.

For many years the band was on hiatus but as of 2012, Ben and Jimmy "Lownote", along with former members of the band "The Blue Jays", Jay Murphree (upright Bass) and Matt Spaugh (drums), have begun to perform live.

Starting in 2014 founding member and songwriter Ben Friedman has enlisted Micah Cadwell, from "The Holsteins" fame on lead guitar, Todd Kerstetter on upright bass, and Charlie Blevins on drums. A new single was recorded by the four in March of that year at David Keith's at Gintown Studios.

In 2022 the band and all its original members reformed to play the Waterfest concert series in Oshkosh WI and Smiths Ole Bar in Atlanta GA.

Songwriter Ben Friedman is working on solo music along with writing short stories.

Band members
The following includes a listing of current and past members:

References
Adam St. James, Still Smokin', Miami New Times, June 25, 1998

Rockabilly music groups
Rock music groups from Georgia (U.S. state)